Saturia is an upazila of Manikganj District in the Division of Dhaka, Bangladesh. The administrative center is located in Saturia.

Geography
It has 27174 households and total area 140.12 km2.

Demographics
As of the 1991 Bangladesh census, Saturia has a population of 140215. Males constitute 49.84% of the population, and females 50.16%. This Upazila's eighteen up population is 73439. Saturia has an average literacy rate of 22% (7+ years), and the national average of 32.4% literate.

Administration
Saturia Upazila is divided into nine union parishads: Baliyati, Baried, Dargram, Dhankora, Dighulia, Fukurhati, Hargaj, Saturia, and Tilli. The union parishads are subdivided into 166 mauzas and 224 villages.

The Upozila Parishad Office is at The Village name Baliati.

Education

According to Banglapedia, Baliati Iswar Chandra High School, founded in 1919, is a notable secondary school.

Gallery

See also
 Upazilas of Bangladesh
 Districts of Bangladesh
 Divisions of Bangladesh

References

Upazilas of Manikganj District